Potato River 156A is an Indian reserve of the Lac La Ronge Indian Band in Saskatchewan. It is 6 miles south of La Ronge.

References

Indian reserves in Saskatchewan
Division No. 18, Saskatchewan